Abu al-Rabi Sulayman ibn 'Abd Allah al-Hawwat Shafshawani (1747–1816) was a Moroccan historian, biographer and poet.

Bibliography
Works by Sulayman al-Hawwat:

Thamarat ansi fi al-ratif bi-nafsi, Morocco : Markaz al-Dirasat wa-al-Buhuth al-Andalusiyah, 1996. (This book-length, first person account covers the author's life and family, including his father's four brothers.)
On the Banu Suda al-Murri family from Fez: Al Rawda al maqsuda wa-l-halal al-mamduda fi ma'athir Bani Suda (2vols.), Casablanca, 1994
An exhaustive treatise on the Dila'yun family: Al-Budiir al-Dawiyya a fi ta'rif bi-'l-Sadat ahl al-Zawiya al-Dila'iya
Al-Sirr al-Zahir fi man ahraza bi Faz al-sharaf al-bahir min akab al-shaykh Abd al-Kadir, Fez, s.a.

References

M. Marin, "Knowledge, kinship and mysticism: the formative years of Sulayman al-Hawwat", in:  Jerusalem Studies in Arabic and Islam,  vol. 31(2006)
Abdelkader Chauoui. "De como los marroquies escribian autobiografias en el siglo XVIII: image y nombre propio."in: Fernandez Parilla Gymmrc. El Magreb y Europa: literatura y traduccion ed. Ediciones de la Universidad de Castilla-La Mancha, 1999, pp. 97–116 (article about Thamara Ansa by Sulayman al-Hawwat as the paradigm of the autobiography genre)

Moroccan autobiographers
18th-century Moroccan historians
18th-century Moroccan poets
1747 births
1816 deaths
People from Chefchaouen
19th-century Moroccan historians
19th-century Moroccan poets